Juan Isidro Hiracheta Martínez (born 15 May 1990) is a Mexican amateur boxer who won a silver medal in the super heavyweight division during the 2011 Pan American Games.

Hiracheta upset Venezuelan José Payares and Colombian Isaías Mena but lost the final bout 13:20 to Italo Perea from Ecuador.

References

1990 births
Living people
Sportspeople from Monterrey
Boxers from Nuevo León
Boxers at the 2011 Pan American Games
Mexican male boxers
Pan American Games silver medalists for Mexico
Pan American Games medalists in boxing
Super-heavyweight boxers
Medalists at the 2011 Pan American Games